Otterbein University is a private university in Westerville, Ohio. It offers 74 majors and 44 minors as well as eight graduate programs. The university was founded in 1847 by the Church of the United Brethren in Christ and named for United Brethren founder the Rev. Philip William Otterbein.  As a result of a division and two mergers involving the church, it has been associated since 1968 with the United Methodist Church. In 2010, its name was changed back from Otterbein College to Otterbein University because of an increasing number of graduate and undergraduate programs.

It is primarily an undergraduate institution with approximately 2,300 undergraduate and 450 graduate students on the campus.  Otterbein has over 100 student organizations and a popular Greek presence. The school's mascot is Cardy the Cardinal and the school is a member of the Ohio Athletic Conference in NCAA Division III athletics.

History 

Otterbein University was founded in 1847 by the Church of the United Brethren in Christ. As a result of a division and two mergers involving the church, the university has since 1968 been associated with the United Methodist Church. The university is named for United Brethren founder, Philip William Otterbein.

In 1859, Otterbein enrolled its first African-American student, William Hannibal Thomas, but he was beaten and taunted by white students. The university told him his continued enrollment "imperiled the very existence of the school" and said it would expel him if he did not withdraw voluntarily, which he did after 10 weeks. Otterbein did not grant a degree to a Black student until 1893.

Campus 
The Otterbein campus is located in Westerville, Ohio. It sits between Alum Creek on the west and State Street (Ohio State Route 3) on the east. West Home Street, which runs through the center of campus, is the address of most of the college's homes and student residence halls (such as 25 [Suite Style Residence], Mayne Hall, Hanby Hall, 163 W. Home Street, and Clements Hall), as well as the Campus Center. The north end of the campus is home to most underclassman housing, the health and physical education department, athletic facilities, as well as the Clements Recreation Center. Overall, the Campus occupies .

Academics 

Otterbein requires students to take a broad variety of courses. It offers B.A., B.S., B.F.A., B.Mus., B.M.E., B.S.E., B.S.N., MAE, MBA,  MSN and DNP degrees in 74 majors and 41 minors. Since Fall 2011, the university has run on the semester calendar. Otterbein University's graduate school features programs in business administration (MBA), nursing (MSN, DNP), education, Educational mathematics, and science in allied health.

School of Art & Sciences 
The School of Arts and Sciences houses departments and programs in: art, biological science, biochemistry & molecular biology, chemistry, communications, earth science, English, English as a second language, history, mathematical sciences, modern languages & cultures, music, philosophy, physics, political science, psychology, religion, sociology & anthropology, and theatre & dance.
Otterbein also has programs in theatre, dance, music, and film. Twenty-eight percent of Otterbein students study abroad. The university sponsors semester-long programs in four locations—London, England; Barbados; Paris, France; and Madrid, Spain—and several short-term summer programs in locations such as Nicaragua, all of which are staffed by Otterbein professors. Students can also choose to study in a variety of other countries through alternative providers.

School of Professional Studies 
The School of Professional Studies houses departments and programs in business, accounting & economics, education, engineering, equine science, health & sports sciences, and nursing.

Rankings and admission 
In its 2012 edition of "America's Best Colleges", Otterbein was ranked 14th in the "Regional Universities (Midwest)" category by U.S. News & World Report.   U.S. News & World Report classifies its selectivity as "more selective." In its 2018 edition of "America's Best Colleges", Otterbein was ranked #19(tie) in "Regional Universities (Midwest)" category, #12(tie) in "Best Colleges for Veterans" category, and #35 in "Best Value Schools" category by U.S. News & World Report. Schools are ranked according to their performance across a set of widely accepted indicators of excellence. Other awards include: President's Higher Education Community Service Honor Roll for 6 straight years.

Music program 
The Department of Music at Otterbein offers the degrees of Bachelor of Music, Bachelor of Music Education, and Bachelor of Arts in a number of majors including music business, music history and literature, jazz studies, and general music studies. The music program at Otterbein includes many diverse ensembles of different sizes, as well as an opera theatre program. The touring ensembles are Concert Choir, Symphonic Band, and String Orchestra, which tour nationally and internationally. Other ensembles include Marching Band, Opus One vocal jazz, Cardinal Singers (formerly Women's Chorale), Vox Otterbein (formerly Men's Chorus), Otterbein Singers, The Anticipations rock cover band, Jazz Combo, Early Music, and Red Noise, the new music ensemble. The music department is housed in Battelle Fine Arts Center. Graduates go on to teach music in K-12 schools, perform in professional opera, symphony orchestras, and bands, compose music, and teach privately.

Theatre and art program 

Professional training is offered in the areas of Acting, Design/Technology, and Musical Theatre with BFA degrees offered in all three programs and a dance concentration in the latter. A BA degree in Theatre is also available, which allows students to tailor the major to suit interests in directing, writing, and stage management among others. In addition, the department offers a dance minor. Otterbein University Theatre and Otterbein Summer Theatre stage nine shows a year. Plays range from classical Shakespearean dramas and British comedies to full-scale musicals and experimental works. The department also presents an annual dance concert designed by many of the university's choreographers. Three galleries show art by students, faculty and guest artists, as well as pieces from Otterbein's permanent collection.

Athletics 

The Otterbein Cardinals compete in NCAA Division III, as a member of the Ohio Athletic Conference. Otterbein's traditional opponents include: Baldwin Wallace University, Capital University, Heidelberg University, John Carroll University, Marietta College, University of Mount Union, Muskingum University, Ohio Northern University, and Wilmington College. They sponsor ten men's and nine women's varsity sports, including:
 Baseball (men)
 Basketball (men/women)
 Cross country (men/women)
 Football (men)
 Golf (men/women)
 Lacrosse (men/women)
 Soccer (men/women)
 Softball (women)
 Tennis (men/women)
 Track and field (men/women)
 Volleyball (women)
 Wrestling (men)

Greek life 
Otterbein's history of social Greek organizations dates back to 1908, when members of the debate society started Pi Beta Sigma Fraternity, with Sigma Alpha Tau Sorority being founded in 1910. 12 of the 14 Greek chapters on campus are local, meaning they were founded and exist only at Otterbein. There are six sororities and eight fraternities at Otterbein; all six sororities are local, while six fraternities are local and two are national. Within their Greek Life they have two of the oldest independent chapters in the United States, Pi Beta Sigma and Pi Kappa Phi (not connected to the national Pi Kappa Phi).

Panhellenic Sororities at Otterbein:

Sigma Alpha Tau (ΣΑΤ),
Tau Epsilon Mu (ΤΕΜ),
Epsilon Kappa Tau (ΕΚΤ),
Theta Nu (ΘΝ),
Tau Delta (ΤΔ), and 
Kappa Phi Omega (ΚΦΩ)

IntraFraternity Council Fraternities at Otterbein:

Local:
Pi Beta Sigma (ΠΒΣ),
Pi Kappa Phi (ΠΚΦ),
Sigma Delta Phi (ΣΔΦ),
Eta Phi Mu (ΗΦΜ),
Lambda Gamma Epsilon (ΛΓΕ), and 
Zeta Phi (ΖΦ)

National:
Alpha Sigma Phi (ΑΣΦ) and
Phi Delta Theta (ΦΔΘ)

WOBN 

WOBN, whose frequency is 97.5 FM, is Otterbein's student-run radio station, playing college rock for Otterbein and surrounding Westerville. WOBN is the flagship of Otterbein Sports, covering many of the games for basketball, football, and baseball. WOBN has been operating since 1948.

Residence halls

Traditional residence halls 
 Clements Hall (Sophomore Housing)
 Clements Hall houses 106 upperclassmen men and women on four floors including four RAs.
 Davis Hall (Health & Wellness LLC)
 Davis Hall is home to 110 first year and upper class students as well as six resident assistants and one assistant director of Residence Life. Most of the rooms are doubles. This two-story building features at least one lounge on each floor and the laundry room and kitchen are located on the first floor.
 Dunlap King Hall (Arts Appreciation, Open Space & Radical Creativity LLC)
 Dunlap-King (DK) is the oldest residence hall on campus. It houses 96 first year and upper class students including four Resident Assistants. 
 Dunlap King Hall has a theme of Arts Appreciation, is home to the Radical Creativity LLC and Open Space. Arts Appreciation is for students interested in the arts but not necessarily majoring in art, music, or theatre.
 Engle, Garst and Scott Halls (The Triad)
 The Triad is a complex consisting of three buildings for first year and upper class students: Scott Hall, home to 36 men or women including two Resident assistants; Engle Hall, home to 45 men or women including two resident assistants; and Garst Hall, home to 75 students including three resident assistants and one assistant director of Residence Life. 
 Garst Hall is available for continuous housing, meaning the building is always open during winter break and summer (daily fee applies).
 Garst and Scott Halls are single-story buildings. Engle Hall has two floors. 
 Mayne Hall (Leadership LLC & Honors Community)
 Mayne Hall is the home for 138 first year and upper class students including seven Resident Assistants. Mayne Hall is home to the Honors Housing program and the Leadership LLC. Residents in Mayne Hall may participate in the Kneading Minds program, which is run through the Honors Program, and bakes bread once a month in the hall kitchen. 
 Mayne Hall has four floors with women residing on first, third and fourth floors and men on the second floor. Two single rooms are located on the first floor with all other rooms being doubles.
 Hanby Hall (STEM Community)
 Hanby Hall accommodates 121 first-year students, including six Resident Assistants and one Hall Director. Most rooms in Hanby are doubles with one triple located on each upper floor. Hanby Hall is connected to Clements Hall through the west stairwell. Students call the Clements and Hanby community "Clanby".

Suite style housing 
 25 W. Home Street
 Opened in the fall of 2008, 25 W. Home Street is one of Otterbein's two suite-style residence halls housing 200 upper class students including six Resident Assistants and one assistant director of Residence Life.
 DeVore Hall
 DeVore Hall was opened in Fall 2006 as Otterbein's first suite-style residence hall. Housing 174 upperclassman students including six Resident Assistant.

Commons apartments 
 Home Street and Park Street
 The Commons apartment complexes are located in two areas on campus. Each complex consists of four small buildings providing apartment housing for juniors and seniors located in the heart of campus.
 Selection for the apartments occurs in spring semester. Rising juniors and seniors may apply for an apartment with a group of students. Each year, three buildings at each complex are available for Summer + Academic Year leases, which begin the second Monday after graduation. The remaining building is only available for Academic Year leases, which begin the day before classes begin in the fall, due to summer deep cleaning and minor renovations (painting, carpeting, etc.).

Theme houses 
Theme houses are an on-campus living option for students with a common goal. Residents of each house are expected to create and take part in programming events to benefit the residents, the special interest group they represent, and the campus community. Any full-time sophomore, junior or senior Otterbein student in good standing with the university is eligible to live in a university-operated house.

Each house is advised by a university academic or administrative department which determines the selection process for students residing in the individual houses.

Houses are eligible for gender-inclusive housing, meaning students residing in the houses may determine if the house will be gender inclusive or single sex. All residents must agree to the status prior to signing an agreement to live in the house.

Current theme houses 

 The Education House - 162 W. Home Street
 Residents living in the Education House are education majors. These students support one another through the Education Program and plan programs for the Columbus City Schools, leadership development and student teaching. Residents serve as role models to freshmen education majors and those going through the student teaching process. In addition, they host a variety of meetings, programs, and socials sponsored by the Education Department.
 The Spiritual Growth House (SGH)- 155 W. Home Street
 The Spiritual Growth House (SGH) is a unique living environment for students interested in learning more about themselves on a spiritual and personal level. Students can engage and interact in conversations with members of the Otterbein Christian Fellowship and learn more about Religious Life. This year, the house will plan numerous events regarding prayer and religion and host a variety of socials open to the campus community.
 The House of Black Culture - 154 W. Home Street
 The House of Black Culture (HBC) is named after Otterbein's first African American graduate, William Henry Fouse. The HBC was established in 1994 and serves as a meeting and social space for African American students. The house offers living space to individuals who are involved in the African American Student Union and/or other diversity organizations on campus. The HBC promotes cultural exchange for the Otterbein community through programming and discussions. The HBC also assists the Office of Social Justice & Activism by hosting receptions for visiting guests. Signature programs include a Welcome Back Cookout and End of the Year Cookout.
 GLTBQ Resource House - 46 W. Home Street
 The GLBTQ Resource House is located near 25 W. Home.

Notable alumni 

 Harold Anderson, 1924, Men's basketball coach at Bowling Green State University and the University of Toledo.
 Jonathon Bennett, Actor. Attended but did not graduate
 Bob Corbin, former member of the Ohio House of Representatives
 Matt D'Orazio, 1999, Arena Football League quarterback, 2-time ArenaBowl MVP, ArenaBowl XX, 2006; ArenaBowl XXII, 2008.
 Susan Diol, television actress
 Agnes Meyer Driscoll, American cryptanalyst during both World War I and World War II
 Eunice Foster, agronomist at Michigan State University
 Henry Clay Frick, attended but did not graduate; business partner in Andrew Carnegie's Carnegie Steel Company, later a major American art patron.
 Anne Gonzales, member of Ohio House of Representatives
 David Graf, 1972, Actor, best known for his role as Sgt. Eugene Tackleberry in the Police Academy series of films
 Benjamin Russell Hanby, 1858, American composer of over 80 songs and hymns, including Darling Nelly Gray, "Up on the House Top", "Jolly Old Saint Nicholas", and Who Is He In Yonder Stall?.
 Lillian Resler Keister Harford, 1872, church organizer and editor
 Rachael Harris, 1989, Film and television actress and comedian.
 Butch Hartman, attended circa 1960, USAC national stock car champion
 Dee Hoty, 1974, Tony-nominated Broadway actress
 Sam Jaeger, 1999, American actor, best known for his role as Matt Dowd in the ABC television series Eli Stone
 Chris Jansing (born Christine Kapostasy), 1978, American television news correspondent. Currently working for NBC News as NBC's Senior White House Correspondent.
 Dominic Jones, 1987, Arena Football League defensive back.
 Gordon Jump, 1955, Actor WKRP in Cincinnati, as well as his WKRP character, Arthur Carlson
 Fred Martinelli, 1951, Hall of Fame Football coach at Ashland University
 Jim McKee, 1969, pitcher for the Pittsburgh Pirates
 Zeola Hershey Misener, suffragist and one of the first women elected to the Indiana General Assembly
 Ladan Osman, Sillerman First Book Prize-winning poet
 Leif Pettersen, 1973, slotback who played eight seasons in the Canadian Football League for the Saskatchewan Roughriders and the Hamilton Tiger-Cats.
 Cabot Rea, 1978, television news anchorman, formerly served as the evening and night co-anchorman for WCMH in Columbus, Ohio.
 Micheaux Robinson, AF2, CFL, and Arena Football League defensive back.
 James Scully, 2014, Actor, best known for his role as Forty Quinn in the Netflix television series You
 Cory Michael Smith, Actor, best known for his role as Edward Nigma (Riddler) in the Fox television drama series Gotham.
 Steve Traylor, 1973, college baseball coach at Florida Atlantic, Duke, and Wofford.
 Frank Truitt, 1950, collegiate basketball coach at Ohio State University, Louisiana State University, and Kent State University; co-founder of Otterbein University's golf team.
 Carroll Widdoes, 1926, Head football coach at Ohio State University and Ohio University.
 John Finley Williamson, 1911, choral music pedagogue and founder of Westminster Choir College.

References

External links

 
 Otterbein Athletics website
 The Point

 
Educational institutions established in 1846
Otterbein College
Otterbein College
Universities and colleges in Franklin County, Ohio
1846 establishments in Ohio